is a railway station on the North Rias Line in the town of Iwaizumi, Iwate Prefecture, Japan, operated by Sanriku Railway.

Lines
Omoto Station is served by the Rias Line, and lies 117.1 kilometers from the terminus of the line at Sakari Station.

Station layout 
Omoto Station has a single island platform connected to the station building by an underground passage. The station building is staffed, and also serves as the Iwaizumi Disaster Relief Centre as well as the Iwaizumi Tourist Information Centre.

Platforms

Adjacent stations

History 
The station, originally named , opened on 1 April 1984.

During the 11 March 2011 Tōhoku earthquake and tsunami, part of the tracks and the station building at Shimanoshi were swept away, suspending services on a portion of the Sanriku Railway. However, the section of the line from Omoto to  reopened on 29 March 2011, and the section from Omoto to  reopened on 6 April 2014.

From 27 December 2015, the station was renamed Iwaizumi-Omoto Station. The renaming was at the request of the town of Iwaizumi, as no stations serving the town contain the name "Iwaizumi" following the closure of the JR East Iwaizumi Line and Iwaizumi Station in 2014.

Minami-Rias Line, a portion of Yamada Line, and Kita-Rias Line constitute Rias Line on 23 March 2019. Accordingly, this station became an intermediate station of Rias Line.

Surrounding area 
National Route 45
National Route 455
 Omoto Post Office

See also
 List of railway stations in Japan

References

External links 

  

Railway stations in Iwate Prefecture
Railway stations in Japan opened in 1984
Rias Line
Iwaizumi, Iwate